Bulbophyllum concavibasalis is a species of orchid in the genus Bulbophyllum. It grows well in many tropical places such as PNG and Indonesia. It tends to grow individually with 1 flower per plant

References
The Bulbophyllum-Checklist
The Internet Orchid Species Photo Encyclopedia

concavibasalis